Agle is a village in the municipality of Snåsa in Trøndelag county, Norway.

Agle has a montessori school, a kindergarten, and an arena for biathlon. Agle also has a community center called Bergkollen.

References

Villages in Trøndelag
Snåsa